Eric Williams (1927-2009) was a speedway rider from Wales.

Speedway career 
Williams was a leading speedway rider in the 1950s. He reached the final of the Speedway World Championship on three occasions in the 1951 Individual Speedway World Championship, 1953 Individual Speedway World Championship and 1955 Individual Speedway World Championship.

He rode in the top tier of British Speedway, riding for Wembley Lions.

World Final appearances

Individual World Championship
 1951 –  London, Wembley Stadium – 12th - 6pts
 1953 –  London, Wembley Stadium – 13th - 4pts
 1955 –  London, Wembley Stadium – 4th - 12+1pts

Family
His two brothers, Freddie Williams and Ian Williams were also speedway riders, Freddie was a double World champion.

References 

1927 births
2009 deaths
British speedway riders
Welsh speedway riders
Wembley Lions riders
Birmingham Brummies riders
Cradley Heathens riders
New Cross Rangers riders
Norwich Stars riders
Welsh motorcycle racers
Sportspeople from Port Talbot